Charles W. Gillam (1861–1933) was a state senator for Minnesota's 10th district serving Cottonwood and Jackson counties.  Gillam was born in Omro, Wisconsin in 1861, but was educated in Windom Public Schools.  He served in the Minnesota Senate from 1915 to 1926.  He was preceded by Andrew Olson  and succeeded by Moses Frost.  Outside of his work as a senator, he was the vice-president of Windom National Bank and served as mayor of Windom, Minnesota for three terms.  Gillam died in 1933.

References

Minnesota state senators
People from Omro, Wisconsin
Mayors of places in Minnesota
People from Windom, Minnesota
1861 births
1933 deaths